Elkin Blanco Rivas (born 5 September 1989), known as Elkin Blanco, is a Colombian football midfielder who currently plays for Orense in the Categoría Primera A.

Career

Club
In July 2014, Blanco joined Moldovan Divizia Națională side Sheriff Tiraspol on a six-month loan. Blanco returned to Millonarios at the end of his loan deal in January 2015.

International
In 2009, he played South American Championship U-20 in Venezuela.

Career statistics

Club

Notes

References

External links

1989 births
Living people
Colombian footballers
Colombian expatriate footballers
Once Caldas footballers
Millonarios F.C. players
FC Sheriff Tiraspol players
Atlético Nacional footballers
América de Cali footballers
Águilas Doradas Rionegro players
Atlético Bucaramanga footballers
Categoría Primera A players
Moldovan Super Liga players
Ecuadorian Serie A players
Sportspeople from Chocó Department
Association football midfielders
Colombian expatriate sportspeople in Moldova
Colombian expatriate sportspeople in Ecuador
Expatriate footballers in Moldova
Expatriate footballers in Ecuador